Qiaotou is a town under the jurisdiction of the prefecture-level city of Dongguan in the Pearl River Delta region of Guangdong province, China. It is located at the eastern periphery of Dongguan.

External links

Geography of Dongguan
Towns in Guangdong